What a Man is a 1930 American pre-Code romantic comedy film directed by George Crone and starring Reginald Denny, Miriam Seegar and Harvey Clark. It was an adaptation of the play They All Want Something by Courtenay Savage, which was itself based on a novel by E.J. Rath. A separate Spanish language version Thus Is Life was made at the same time. The film was remade in 1938 as Merrily We Live. It is also known by the alternative title The Gentleman Chauffeur.

Premise
A British ex-Grenadier Guards officer moves to America, but struggles to find work. After he is employed as a chauffeur to a wealthy family, he falls in love with his employer's daughter.

Cast
 Reginald Denny as Wade Rawlins  
 Miriam Seegar as Eileen Kilbourne 
 Harvey Clark as Mr. Kilbourne 
 Lucille Ward as Mrs. Kilbourne  
 Carlyle Moore Jr. as Kane Kilbourne  
 Anita Louise as Marion Kilbourne  
 Norma Drew as Elsie Thayer 
 Christiane Yves as Marquise de la Fresne  
 Charles Coleman as William, the Butler 
 Greta Granstedt as Hanna, the Maid

References

Bibliography
 Waldman, Harry. Hollywood and the Foreign Touch: A Dictionary of Foreign Filmmakers and Their Films from America, 1910-1995. Scarecrow Press, 1996.

External links

1930 films
American romantic comedy films
1930 romantic comedy films
Films directed by George Crone
American black-and-white films
Films based on American novels
American films based on plays
American multilingual films
1930 multilingual films
1930s English-language films
1930s American films